Emerson Lewis Richards (July 9, 1884 – October 21, 1963), an attorney, was a Republican New Jersey State Senator from Atlantic City.

Biography
Richards was born on July 9, 1884, in Atlantic City, New Jersey. He was a state senator for Atlantic County. Richards also served as the acting Governor of New Jersey in 1933 during the tenure of Arthur Harry Moore as President of the New Jersey Senate.

Richards was also a designer of pipe organs including the largest pipe organ in the world the Boardwalk Hall Auditorium Organ.

References

1884 births
1963 deaths
Presidents of the New Jersey Senate
20th-century American politicians